Defying the Law is a 1924 American silent drama film directed by Bertram Bracken and starring Lew Cody, Renée Adorée, and Josef Swickard.

Cast

References

Bibliography
 Munden, Kenneth White. The American Film Institute Catalog of Motion Pictures Produced in the United States, Part 1. University of California Press, 1997.

External links
 

1924 films
1924 drama films
1920s English-language films
American silent feature films
Silent American drama films
Films directed by Bertram Bracken
Gotham Pictures films
1920s American films